Fillmore is a city in Andrew County, Missouri, United States. The population was 184 at the 2010 census.

History
Fillmore was laid out in 1845 and was named for Millard Fillmore, a statesman, and afterward 13th President of the United States. A post office called Fillmore has been in operation since 1851.

Geography
Fillmore is located at  (40.025478, -94.973210).

Demographics

2010 census
At the 2010 census there were 184 people in 70 households, including 50 families, in the city. The racial makup of the city was 98.4% White, 0.5% Native American, and 1.1% from two or more races.
Of the 70 households 42.9% had children under the age of 18 living with them, 50.0% were married couples living together, 14.3% had a female householder with no husband present, 7.1% had a male householder with no wife present, and 28.6% were non-families. 24.3% of households were one person and 4.3% were one person aged 65 or older. The average household size was 2.63 and the average family size was 3.20.

The median age was 31.5 years. 34.2% of residents were under the age of 18; 7.1% were between the ages of 18 and 24; 26.6% were from 25 to 44; 23.8% were from 45 to 64; and 8.2% were 65 or older. The gender makeup of the city was 50.5% male and 49.5% female.

2000 census
At the 2000 census there were 211 people in 83 households, including 52 families, in the city. The population density was 1,520.0 people per square mile (581.9/km). There were 94 housing units at an average density of 677.2 per square mile (259.2/km).  The racial makup of the city was 98.58% White, 0.47% Native American and 0.95% Asian. Hispanic or Latino of any race were 0.47%.

Of the 83 households 37.3% had children under the age of 18 living with them, 51.8% were married couples living together, 6.0% had a female householder with no husband present, and 37.3% were non-families. 32.5% of households were one person and 12.0% were one person aged 65 or older. The average household size was 2.54 and the average family size was 3.29.

The age distribution was 31.8% under the age of 18, 10.0% from 18 to 24, 29.4% from 25 to 44, 18.0% from 45 to 64, and 10.9% 65 or older. The median age was 32 years. For every 100 females, there were 95.4 males. For every 100 females age 18 and over, there were 102.8 males.

The median household income was $31,750 and the median family income  was $28,750. Males had a median income of $26,667 versus $22,917 for females. The per capita income for the city was $13,047. About 18.0% of families and 15.2% of the population were below the poverty line, including 23.3% of those under the age of eighteen and 4.5% of those sixty five or over.

References

Cities in Andrew County, Missouri
St. Joseph, Missouri metropolitan area
Cities in Missouri